Maalik Benjamin Wayns (born May 2, 1991) is an American-Belarusian former basketball player and coach. He played high school basketball for Roman Catholic High School in Philadelphia, where he was a Parade All-American as well as a McDonald's All-American before playing college basketball for Villanova University under coach Jay Wright. He is now head coach at Camden High School in Camden, New Jersey.

Early life
Wayns was born on May 2, 1991, in Philadelphia, Pennsylvania to Verland and Deborah Wayns. Maalik has one sibling named V. J. Wayns.

High school career
Wayns was a member of Roman Catholic High School's varsity basketball team. As a Junior, he averaged 22.4 points, 5.1 assists, 4.8 rebounds, and 2.1 steals. Wayns was also a two-time MVP in the Philadelphia Catholic League and also first team all-city and all-state in Pennsylvania.  As a Senior, Wayns averaged 19.2 points, 5.1 rebounds and 5.5 assists. He was named a third-team Parade All-American and McDonald's All-American at the end of the year.

College career

Freshman
Wayns chose to attend Villanova University to play under coach Jay Wright. On November 16, 2009, Wayns scored 16 points in 18 minutes to help Villanova defeat the University of Pennsylvania. He was named Big East All-Rookie Team and won the Big East Rookie of the Week three times. Wayns finished with 6.8 points and 1.3 assists.

Sophomore
Wayns scored 15 points and 6 assists against Bucknell University on November 12, 2010. He had a career night against the Marist Red Foxes on November 16, 2010, as he scored 17 points to go with 4 assists and 7 rebounds and 1 steal as 'Nova won 84–47. He recorded his first double-double against Boston University on November 17, 2010, scoring 12 points and dishing 12 assists. He had a career-high 19 points against UCLA on November 24, 2010, along with 6 rebounds as Villanova won 82–70.

Junior
As a junior in 2011–12, Wayns earned second-team All-Big East honors after averaging 17.6 points per game.

Professional career

2012–13 season
After going undrafted in the 2012 NBA draft, Wayns joined the Orlando Magic for the Orlando Summer League and the Golden State Warriors for the Las Vegas Summer League. On July 31, 2012, he signed with the Philadelphia 76ers. On January 6, 2013, he was waived by the 76ers but was re-signed to a 10-day contract two days later. He was not re-signed when that contract expired. On January 21, 2013, he was acquired by the Rio Grande Valley Vipers of the NBA Development League.

On March 9, 2013, Wayns signed a 10-day contract with the Los Angeles Clippers. On March 19, he signed a second 10-day contract with the Clippers, and on March 29, he signed with the Clippers for the remainder of the season.

2013–14 season
In July 2013, Wayns joined the Clippers for the 2013 NBA Summer League and later joined the team for training camp, where he made the final roster on a non-guaranteed contract for the 2013–14 season. On January 5, 2014, he was waived by the Clippers, and three days later, he signed another 10-day contract with the Clippers. On January 16, he was waived by the Clippers. On February 17, 2014, he was reacquired by the Rio Grande Valley Vipers.

2014–15 season
After playing three games for the Washington Wizards during the 2014 NBA Summer League, Wayns signed a one-year deal with Žalgiris Kaunas of the Lithuanian Basketball League on July 30, 2014. On October 13, 2014, he parted ways with Žalgiris due to injury before appearing in a game for them.

On January 12, 2015, Wayns' returning player rights were traded by Rio Grande Valley to the Delaware 87ers in exchange for the returning player rights to Hamady N'Diaye. On February 3, 2015, he officially joined the 87ers. On April 6, 2015, after the end of the 2014–15 D-League season, Wayns signed with Atenienses de Manatí of Puerto Rico for the rest of the 2015 BSN season.

2015–16 season
On August 14, 2015, Wayns signed with Pallacanestro Varese of the Italian Serie A for the 2015–16 season.

2016–17 season
On August 1, 2016, Wayns signed with Enisey Krasnoyarsk of Russia for the 2016–17 season.

On November 24, 2016, Wayns signed with the Israeli team Maccabi Rishon LeZion.

2017–18 season
On August 28, 2017, Wayns signed with the Dallas Mavericks. On October 14, 2017, he was waived by the Mavericks. On October 25, 2017, he signed with Spanish club Joventut Badalona for the rest of the 2017–18 ACB season.

2019–20 season
On August 27, 2019, he has signed with Tsmoki-Minsk of VTB United League. On February 2, 2020, Wayns signed with Mahram Tehran BC of the Iranian Basketball Super League.

The Basketball Tournament (TBT)
In the summer of 2017, Wayns competed in The Basketball Tournament on ESPN for Team FOE, a Philadelphia based team coached by NBA forwards Markieff and Marcus Morris. In two games, Wayns averaged 10.0 points, 2.5 rebounds and 1.5 assists as Team FOE advanced to the Super 16 Round in Brooklyn, New York.  FOE ended up losing 72–67 in the Super 16 against Boeheim's Army, a team composed of Syracuse University basketball alum.  Wayns also competed for FOE in 2016 as well.  In three games that summer, he averaged 18.0 points, 4.7 rebounds and 3.3 assists per game.

Coaching career
As of the 2021–22 season, Wayns serves on the Student Athlete Development staff for the Villanova Men's Basketball team. In his role, Wayns focuses on off-court development of student-athletes.

On November 17, 2022, Wayns was hired as the new head coach of  Camden High School's boys basketball team, succeeding Rick Brunson, who departed to join the New York Knicks coaching staff.

References

External links

Villanova bio
Eurobasket.com profile
FIBA.com profile

1991 births
Living people
American emigrants to Belarus
American expatriate basketball people in Iran
American expatriate basketball people in Israel
American expatriate basketball people in Italy
American expatriate basketball people in Russia
American expatriate basketball people in Spain
American men's basketball players
Basketball players from Philadelphia
BC Enisey players
Belarusian men's basketball players
Belarusian people of American descent
Delaware 87ers players
Joventut Badalona players
Liga ACB players
Los Angeles Clippers players
Maccabi Rishon LeZion basketball players
McDonald's High School All-Americans
Naturalized citizens of Belarus
Pallacanestro Varese players
Parade High School All-Americans (boys' basketball)
Philadelphia 76ers players
Point guards
Rio Grande Valley Vipers players
Mahram Tehran BC players
Undrafted National Basketball Association players
Universo Treviso Basket players
Villanova Wildcats men's basketball players